Kanwar Abhinay (born 16 June 1991) is an Indian cricketer. He made his first-class debut for Himachal Pradesh in the 2012–13 Ranji Trophy on 1 December 2012. He made his List A debut for Himachal Pradesh in the 2016–17 Vijay Hazare Trophy on 25 February 2017. He made his Twenty20 debut for Himachal Pradesh in the 2017–18 Zonal T20 League on 8 January 2018.

References

External links
 

1991 births
Living people
Indian cricketers
Himachal Pradesh cricketers
People from Hamirpur, Himachal Pradesh